Mill Rock School is a historic one-room schoolhouse located south of Baldwin, Iowa, United States.  It is one of over 217 limestone structures in Jackson County from the mid-19th century, of which 12 are school buildings.  This school building was built in 1869 by Abner Hunt and P.A. Downer.  The stone blocks that were used in the construction of this rectangular structure vary somewhat in shape and size, and they were laid in courses.  The window sills and lintels are dressed stone.  There is a brick chimney on the west elevation, and two entrance doors on the east elevation.  Having two entrance doors is unusual for rural Jackson County schools.  A name and date stone is located in the east gable.

The school building was built in the town of Mill Rock, the first municipality established in Monmouth Township.  When the Midland Railroad was built to the northeast in 1872, the town of Baldwin was established and Mill Rock declined.  A few houses and the school were all that remained by the 1890s.  The school itself was abandoned in the first quarter of the 20th-century.  The building is now owned by the Jackson County Conservation Board, and serves as a community center.  It was listed on the National Register of Historic Places in 1992.

References

School buildings completed in 1869
One-room schoolhouses in Iowa
Vernacular architecture in Iowa
Buildings and structures in Jackson County, Iowa
National Register of Historic Places in Jackson County, Iowa
School buildings on the National Register of Historic Places in Iowa